Kamplikop is a village in Dharwad district of Karnataka, India.

Demographics 
As of the 2011 Census of India there were 226 households in Kamplikop and a total population of 1,002 consisting of 527 males and 475 females. There were 127 children ages 0-6.

References

Villages in Dharwad district